The 2012–13 Kent State Golden Flashes men's basketball team represented Kent State University during the 2012–13 NCAA Division I men's basketball season. The Golden Flashes, led by second year head coach Rob Senderoff, played their home games at the Memorial Athletic and Convocation Center and were members of the East Division of the Mid-American Conference. They finished the season 21–14, 9–7 in MAC play to finish third place in the East Division. They advanced to the semifinals of the MAC tournament where they lost to Akron. They were invited to the 2013 CIT where they defeated Fairfield in the first round before losing in the second round to Loyola (MD).

Roster

Schedule

|-
!colspan=9| Exhibition

|-
!colspan=9| Regular season

|-
!colspan=9| 2013 MAC men's basketball tournament

|-
!colspan=9| 2013 CIT

References

Kent State Golden Flashes men's basketball seasons
Kent State
Kent State
Kent State
Kent State